Smolno Wielkie  is a village in the administrative district of Gmina Kargowa, within Zielona Góra County, Lubusz Voivodeship, in western Poland.

The village has an approximate population of 760.

References

Smolno Wielkie